Renato Campagnoli (born 19 November 1943) is an Italian professional golfer. He represented Italy three times in the World Cup.

Campagnoli had a successful career on the European Seniors Tour, winning twice; in the 1995 International German PGA Seniors Championship and the 1996 De Vere Hotels Seniors Classic. He was also runner-up in the 1994 Belfast Telegraph Irish Senior Masters (in a playoff), the 1994 Shell Scottish Seniors Open, the 1997 Lawrence Batley Seniors, the 1998 Ryder Seniors Classic and The Belfry PGA Seniors Championship in 1998.

Professional wins (5)
1978 Italian National Open
1980 Italian National Open
1986 Italian PGA Championship

European Senior Tour wins (2)

Team appearances
World Cup (representing Italy): 1974, 1978, 1980
Hennessy Cognac Cup (representing Italy): 1984

External links

Italian male golfers
European Senior Tour golfers
Sportspeople from Florence
1943 births
Living people